The GMC AC 454 is a truck model that the GMC manufactured from 1940 on.

Technical data and history
The GMC AC 454 is a military truck build by the General Motors Company in the USA. It was used in World War II.
The truck has a bridge construction. It has an onboard voltage of 12 volts. In the Swiss army the GMC AC 454 received the designation Lastw. Gl 3.5T 4x2 (off-road truck with 3.5t payload). The Swiss army used about 90 of these trucks.
In 1971 a few GMC AC 454 were rebuilt by Pius Lang from the "Military-Motorfahrer-Gesellschaft des Kantons Zug" with Wood gas generator. The Wood gas generators were mounted on civilian trucks during the Second World War. Such a rebuilt GMC AC 454 is now located in the Zuger Depot Technikgeschichte (Zug depot of technical history).

Pictures

References

Zuger Depot Technikgeschichte

Military trucks of Switzerland
Off-road vehicles